This is a list of wars involving the Republic of Liberia.

References

 
Liberia
Wars
Wars